Jonathan D. Lovitz (born July 19, 1984) is an American Presidential appointee, lesbian, gay, bisexual and transgender (LGBT) rights advocate, small business and public policy advocate, former actor, former political candidate, and served as Senior Vice President of the National LGBT Chamber of Commerce since 2015. He previously served as Communications Director and acting executive director of StartOut. Prior to advocacy, Lovitz was a performer in multiple national tours of Broadway shows, regional theaters, and television shows.

Public Service Career 
In April 2021, Lovitz announced his candidacy for the Pennsylvania House of Representatives in the 182nd district, representing Center City Philadelphia. In February 2023, President Joe Biden appointed Lovitz as Director of Public Affairs & Senior Advisor at the US Economic Development Administration within the US Department of Commerce.  He leads communications and public policy strategy to implement the agenda of Commerce Secretary Gina Raimondo and Assistant Secretary Alejandra Y. Castillo.

Previous Career
Lovitz toured the United States with two national touring productions of Joseph and the Amazing Technicolor Dreamcoat and Jesus Christ Superstar from 2006 to 2008. After moving to New York City in 2008, Lovitz worked in regional theaters and began taking small roles on television. In 2011 Lovitz joined Logo TV as an on-air interviewer for LGBT issues, as well as one of the hosts of Setup Squad.

Lovitz's public profile as an LGBT advocate was raised in 2011 when he refused to serve on a New York City jury, citing the lack of equal protections and marriage equality for LGBT citizens in the state. This led to multiple appearances on MSNBC and NPR that year.

Lovitz joined the National LGBT Chamber of Commerce in 2015 as Vice President of External Affairs and Director of nglccNY; he has served as Senior Vice President since 2016. At the NGLCC, Lovitz oversees media relations and public policy initiatives focused on the LGBT business community. As head of the NGLCC advocacy division, he led the efforts to write, lobby for, and implement policies for the inclusion of certified LGBT Business Enterprises (LGBTBEs) in cities including Los Angeles, CA; Chicago, IL; Miami, FL; Orlando, FL; Nashville, TN; Baltimore, MD; Seattle, WA; and Jersey City, NJ.

In 2018, Business Equality Magazine named Lovitz one of its "40 LGBTQ Leaders Under 40" for his contributions to the LGBT rights movement. He was named to the 40 Under 40 list by the Philadelphia Business Journal in April 2019.  The Advocate Magazine named Lovitz one of their 2019 Queer Icons in August 2019.

Lovitz served on the Red Tape Commission for New York City Comptroller Scott Stringer; and is a pro-bono consultant focused on inclusion initiatives for the Gay Officers Action League (GOAL) of the NYPD, who honored Lovitz with the Sam Ciccone Community Service Award in April 2018.

In 2020, Lovitz co-founded PhillyVoting.org initiative to register voters in the Philadelphia region. The initiative utilizes QR code technology to immediately connect residents to a list of digital resources using any smartphone, tablet, or computer, with a primary focus on engaging Black and LGBTQ+ voters throughout the region. The coverage of the PhillyVoting project in major Philadelphia news outlets, including NBC10 Philadelphia, 6ABC Action News, and Philadelphia Gay News, resulted in over 300 new registered voters in the program's first month.

Personal Life
Lovitz was born in Atlantic City, NJ and grew up in Coral Springs, Florida. He came out at the age of 16 after being involved heavily in local youth theatre and volunteer organizations. He studied theatre at the summer arts conservatory Stagedoor Manor.

Lovitz graduated Summa Cum Laude from the University of Florida in 2006. He was honored as the keynote speaker for University of Florida's Pride Awareness Month's (PAM) 20th anniversary in 2014. Lovitz was named an Outstanding Young Alumni by the University of Florida in April 2018.

He lives in Philadelphia with his husband, NBC News meteorologist Steven Sosna. The two were married in New York City in October 2017 in a ceremony officiated by Jim Obergefell, Supreme Court marriage equality plaintiff in the landmark Obergefell v. Hodges case.

Select filmography

References

External links 
 

1984 births
Living people
American LGBT rights activists
20th-century American male actors
21st-century American male actors
Male actors from Florida
Place of birth missing (living people)
American gay actors
American male television actors
American male stage actors
American male musical theatre actors
Male actors from Philadelphia
University of Florida alumni